Istgah-e Sankhvast (also Romanized as Īstgāh-e Sankhvāst) is a village in Miyan Jovin Rural District, Helali District, Joghatai County, Razavi Khorasan Province, Iran. At the 2006 census, its population was 83, in 25 families.

References 

Populated places in Joghatai County